Kista Science Tower is a 32-story,  skyscraper in Kista, Stockholm, Sweden. The black cube on top of the roof is, contrary to some rumors, not meant to be the start of more floors; it is the top of the elevator shaft and space for the electronics for the antenna. The tower was originally meant to have a few additional floors but they were canceled due to the financial crisis of the early 2000s, however the already built elevator shaft was not shortened and the distinctive concrete block at the top remains. The tower has 33 floors in total, three of which are below the main entrance level consisting mainly of parking spaces.

Kista Science Tower was completed in 2003. It was the tallest skyscraper in Sweden at the time but was soon surpassed by Turning Torso, built in Malmö in 2005. It is still the tallest office building in Scandinavia.

The building is home to the fastest elevators in Sweden.

The building houses several technology and IT companies. It is located next to Kista Galleria, a large shopping complex, and the Kista metro station.

See also
 List of tallest buildings in Sweden

References

External links

Buildings and structures in Stockholm
Office buildings completed in 2003
Skyscrapers in Sweden
Towers in Sweden
Skyscraper office buildings in Sweden